My Life, Your Entertainment is the third and final studio album by P.A., released in 2000. Jim Crow, T.I., 8Ball, Goodie Mob, N.O.R.E., Pimp C, and YoungBloodZ make guest appearances on the album.

Production
The album was produced by P.A., Organized Noize, and Craig Love.

Critical reception
The Pitch wrote that the group "blasts dynamic street rhymes over guitar-laced tracks that would have both Jimi Hendrix and Iceberg Slim smilin’ ... the combination of heavy-metal riffs and seductive pimp-licious grooves created a unique, richly textured sound." Rolling Stone wrote that P.A. "import shades of New York's ride-or-die anthems and old West Coast G-Funk into their crunk landscapes." The New Pittsburgh Courier thought that the album "takes P.A.'s funkadelic hip-hop to a new level with grimy ghetto rhymes, syrupy rock guitars and ham-hock-thick beats."

Track listing
 Hello (Intro)
 My Life, Yo Entertainment
 U Got We Got
 They Come Thru (featuring Jim Crow)
 Just Like That
 Down Flat (featuring T.I.)
 Sundown (featuring 8Ball)
 Handcuffin' (Interlude)
 Playaz Do
 Problems (featuring Khujo)
 Entertainment (Interlude)
 What Was It Fo?
 Dope Stories [Remix] (featuring Big Gipp, Noreaga and Pimp C)
 Somethin' 2 Ride (featuring YoungBloodZ)
 My Time 2 Go (featuring Cee-Lo Green)

References

External links 
 Album on Discogs

2000 albums
P.A. (group) albums
DreamWorks Records albums
Albums produced by Organized Noize